The Fletschhorn (3,985 m) is a mountain of the Pennine Alps, located between the Saas Valley and the Simplon Valley, in the canton of Valais. It lies in the Weissmies group, north of the Lagginhorn. The Fletschhorn is shown to be 3,993 metres high on the 1:200,000 Swisstopo map. However, the largest-scale map (1:25'000) indicates a precise elevation of 3,986 metres above sea level, after previously showing an elevation of 3,984.5 metres.

It was first climbed by Michael Amherdt and his guides Johannes Zumkemmi and Friedrich Clausen in August 1854. The imposing north face was first ascended by E. R. Blanchet with guides Oskar Supersaxo and Kaspar Mooser on 25 July 1927.

See also

References

External links

Mountains of the Alps
Alpine three-thousanders
Mountains of Valais
Pennine Alps
Mountains of Switzerland
Three-thousanders of Switzerland